Port Jervis is a city located at the confluence of the Neversink and Delaware rivers in western Orange County, New York, United States, north of the Delaware Water Gap. Its population was 8,775 at the 2020 census. The communities of Deerpark, Huguenot, Sparrowbush, and Greenville are adjacent to Port Jervis. Matamoras, Pennsylvania, is across the river and connected by the Mid-Delaware Bridge. Montague Township, New Jersey, also borders the city.  The Tri-States Monument, marking the tripoint between New York, New Jersey, and Pennsylvania, lies at the southwestern corner of town.

Port Jervis was part of early industrial history, a point for shipping coal to major markets to the southeast by canal and later by railroads. Its residents had long-distance passenger service by railroad until 1970. The restructuring of railroads resulted in a decline in the city's business and economy.

In the 21st century, from late spring to early fall, many thousands of travelers and tourists pass through Port Jervis on their way to enjoying rafting, kayaking, canoeing and other activities in the Delaware Water Gap National Recreation Area and the Upper Delaware Scenic and Recreational River and the surrounding area.

Port Jervis is part of the Poughkeepsie–Newburgh–Middletown metropolitan area as well as the larger New York metropolitan area. In August 2008, Port Jervis was named one of "Ten Coolest Small Towns" by Budget Travel magazine.

History 

The settlement was originally known as Mahackamack, after a Lenape word. It was raided and burned in 1779 during the American Revolutionary War, by British and Mohawk forces under the command of Mohawk leader Joseph Brant before the Battle of Minisink. Over the next two decades, residents rebuilt the settlement. They developed more roadways to better connect Mahackamack with the eastern parts of Orange County.

After the Delaware and Hudson Canal was opened in 1828, providing transportation of coal from northeastern Pennsylvania to New York and New England via the Hudson River, trade attracted money and further development to the area. A village was incorporated on May 11, 1853. It was renamed as Port Jervis in the mid-19th century, after John Bloomfield Jervis, chief engineer of the D&H Canal. Port Jervis grew steadily into the 1900s, and on July 26, 1907, it became a city.

Coming of the railroad
The first rail line to run through Port Jervis was the New York & Erie Railroad, which in 1832 was chartered to run from Piermont, New York, on the Hudson River in Rockland County, to Lake Erie.  Ground was broken in 1835, but construction was delayed by a nationwide financial panic, and did not start again until 1838.  The line was completed in 1851, and the first passenger train – with President Millard Fillmore and former United States Senator Daniel Webster on board – came through the city on May 14.  The railroad went through a number of name changes, becoming the Erie Railroad in 1897.

A second railroad, the Port Jervis and Monticello Railroad, later leased to the New York, Ontario and Western Railway (O&W), opened in 1868, running northeast out of the city, and eventually connecting to Kingston, New York, Weehawken, New Jersey and eastern connections.

Like the D&H Canal, the railroads brought new prosperity to Port Jervis in the form of increased trade and investment in the community from the outside. However, the competition by the railroad, which could deliver products faster, hastened the decline of the canal, which ceased operation in 1898. The railroads were the basis of the city's economy for the coming decades.  Port Jervis became Erie's division center between Jersey City, New Jersey and Susquehanna, Pennsylvania, and by 1922, 20 passenger trains went through the city every day. More than 2,500 Erie RR employees made their homes there.

The railroads began to decline after the Great Depression. A shift in transportation accelerated after World War II with the federal subsidy of the Interstate Highway System and increased competition from trucking companies.  One of the first Class I railroads to shut down was the O&W, on March 29, 1957, leaving Port Jervis totally reliant on the Erie. A few years later, in 1960, the Erie, also on a shaky financial footing, merged with Delaware, Lackawanna and Western Railroad to become the Erie Lackawanna.  Railroad restructuring continued and in 1976, the Erie Lackawana became part of Conrail, along with a number of other struggling railroads, such as the Penn Central.  Since the breakup of Conrail, the trackage around Port Jervis has been controlled by Norfolk Southern. The decline of the railroads was an economic blow to Port Jervis. The city has struggled to find a new economic basis.

Racial incidents
On June 2, 1892, Robert Lewis, an African American, was lynched, hanged on Main Street in Port Jervis by a mob after being accused of participation in an assault on a white woman. A grand jury indicted nine people for assault and rioting rather than Lewis's lynching. Some literary critics argue that this event influenced Stephen Crane's 1898 novella The Monster. Crane lived in Port Jervis from 1878 until 1883 and frequently visited the area from 1891 to 1897.

In the mid-1920s some residents in the area formed a Ku Klux Klan chapter, in the period of the KKK's early 20th-century revival. They burned crosses on Point Peter, the mountain peak that overlooks the city.

Recent history
The city's location at the confluence of the Delaware and Neversink rivers has made it subject to occasional flooding. There was flooding during the 1955 Hurricane Diane, and a flood-related rumor started a panic in the population. This incident was studied and a 1958 report issued by the National Research Council: "The Effects of a Threatening Rumor on a Disaster-Stricken Community".

In addition to the rivers having flooded during periods of heavy rainfall, at times ice jams have effectively dammed the Delaware, also causing flooding. In 1875 ice floes destroyed the bridge to Matamoras, Pennsylvania. In 1981 a large ice floe resulted in the highest water crest measured to date at the National Weather Service's Matamoras river gauge .

Geography
Port Jervis is located on the north bank of the Delaware River at the confluence where the Neversink River – the Delaware's largest tributary – empties into the larger river. Port Jervis is connected by the Mid-Delaware Bridge across the Delaware to Matamoras, Pennsylvania.

From here the Delaware flows to the southwest, running parallel to Kittatinny Ridge until reaching the Delaware Water Gap. It heads southeastward, continuing past New Hope, Pennsylvania and Lambertville, New Jersey; and the New Jersey capital, Trenton; to Philadelphia, and the Delaware Bay.                          

Port Jervis is also home to the tri-point between New York,Pennsylvania and New Jersey.

Climate 
Port Jervis has a Humid Continental Climate (Köppen Dfb) with relatively hot summers and cold winters. It revives approximately 47.18 inches (1,198 mm) of precipitation per year, most of which occurs in the late spring in early summer. Extremes range from −26 °F (−32 °C) on January 14, 1912, to 105 °F (40.5 °C) on July 9, 1936.

Demographics

As of the census of 2000, there were 8,860 people, 3,533 households, and 2,158 families residing in the city. The racial makeup of the city was 82.4% White, 8.2% African American, 0.59% Native American, 0.64% Asian, 0.02% Pacific Islander, 2.19% from other races, and 2.26% from two or more races. Hispanic or Latino of any race were 7.5% of the population.

There were 3,533 households, out of which 32.4% had children under the age of 18 living with them, 39.9% were married couples living together, 15.6% had a female householder with no husband present, and 38.9% were non-families. 32.6% of all households were made up of individuals, and 15.1% had someone living alone who was 65 years of age or older. The average household size was 2.48 and the average family size was 3.15.

In the city, the age distribution of the population shows 27.8% under the age of 18, 8.4% from 18 to 24, 28.3% from 25 to 44, 20.3% from 45 to 64, and 15.2% who were 65 years of age or older. The median age was 36 years. For every 100 females, there were 91.4 males. For every 100 females age 18 and over, there were 86.0 males.

The median income for a household in the city was $30,241, and the median income for a family was $35,481. Males had a median income of $31,851 versus $22,274 for females. The per capita income for the city was $16,525. About 14.2% of families and 15.7% of the population were below the poverty line, including 25.5% of those under age 18 and 10.3% of those age 65 or over.

Points of interest

State line monuments

Port Jervis lies near the points where the states of New York, New Jersey and Pennsylvania come together. South of the Laurel Grove Cemetery, under the viaduct for Interstate 84, are two monuments marking the boundaries between the three states.

The larger monument is a granite pillar inscribed "Witness Monument". It is not on any boundary itself, but instead is a witness for two boundary points. On the north side (New York), it references the corner boundary point between New York and Pennsylvania that is located in the center of the Delaware River  due west of the Tri-State Rock. On the south side (New Jersey), it references the Tri-State Rock  to the south.

The smaller monument, the Tri-States Monument, also known as the Tri-State Rock, marks both the northwest end of the New Jersey and New York boundary and the north end of the New Jersey and Pennsylvania boundary. It is a small granite block with inscribed lines marking the boundaries of the three states and a bronze National Geodetic Survey marker. Both monuments were erected in 1882.

Transportation 

US 6, U.S. Route 209, New York State Route 42, and New York State Route 97 (the "Upper Delaware Scenic Byway") pass through Port Jervis. Interstate 84 passes to the south.

Port Jervis is the last stop on the  Port Jervis Line, which is a commuter railroad service from Hoboken, New Jersey and New York City (via a Secaucus Transfer) that is contracted to NJ Transit by the Metro-North Railroad of the Metropolitan Transportation Authority. The track itself continues on to Binghamton and Buffalo, but passenger service west of Port Jervis was discontinued in November 1966.

Short Line provides bus service between Honesdale, Pennsylvania, Port Jervis, and the Port Authority Bus Terminal.

Government 

Port Jervis is governed by a mayor and a city council under a mayor–council government system. The city council has nine members: a councilman-at-large and eight members elected from wards. The city comprises four wards, residents of which elect two council members each for two year terms. The mayor and councilman-at-large are elected at large for two year terms. Elections are held in odd number years. Terms of office begin on January 1.

Representation in the state legislature is split between Democrats and Republicans. The city is located in the 98th Assembly district, currently represented by Republican Karl Brabenec. Democrat James Skoufis represents the city in the state senate as part of the 42nd district.

Port Jervis is a part of New York's 18th congressional district, represented by Democrat Pat Ryan. Senators Charles Schumer and Kirsten Gillibrand represent all of New York in the U.S. Senate, including the city.

Education
Port Jervis City School District operates public schools serving Port Jervis. The area elementary school, Anna S. Kuhl Elementary School, is in Deerpark but with a Port Jervis postal address. Port Jervis Middle School is in Port Jervis. Port Jervis High School is also in Deerpark but with a Port Jervis postal address. Kuhl and Port Jervis High are on the same property.

Media
On July 4, 1953 WDLC at 1490 on the AM dial signed-on.  Co-owned. The station also can receive WSPK-FM K104.7 and WRRV on 92.7.

Notable people

Notable current and former residents of Port Jervis include:

Frank Abbott, Mayor of Port Jervis from 1874 to 1876
 Ed and Lou Banach, University of Iowa wrestlers, NCAA All-Americans and NCAA Champions, 1984 Summer Olympics gold medalists in freestyle wrestling, lived in Port Jervis and graduated from Port Jervis Senior High School.
 Daniel Cohen, children's book author
 Stephen Crane, author of The Red Badge of Courage, lived in Port Jervis between the ages 6–11 and frequently visited and wrote there from 1891 to early 1897.
William Howe Crane (1854–1926), older brother of Stephen Crane, lived and practiced law in Port Jervis for many years.
 Stefanie Dolson, basketball player for the New York Liberty and formerly of the Connecticut Huskies Women's Basketball team, was born in Port Jervis. She was a high school standout at nearby Minisink Valley High School, where she was a McDonald's All-American and won multiple National Championships with Connecticut. 
 Samuel Fowler (1851–1919) represented New Jersey's 4th congressional district in the U.S. House of Representatives from 1893 to 1895.
 E. Arthur Gray (1925–2006) was the longest-serving mayor of Port Jervis and was later a New York State Senator. The Port Jervis United States Post Office building is dedicated in his name.
 Benjamin Hafner (March 24, 1821–spring 1899), known as "The Flying Dutchman" and "Uncle Ben", was an American locomotive engineer who worked for the Erie Railway.
Albert Hammond Jr., (1980–), musician and music producer best known as a guitarist of The Strokes. His One Way Studio in the area is where much of the albums Angles and Comedown Machine were recorded, among others.
 Bucky Harris, Baseball player/manager and Hall of Famer; born in Port Jervis.
 The Kalin Twins, Hal (1934–2005) and Herbie (1934–2006), were one hit wonders whose record "When" made the top 5 in the U.S. and was number one for five weeks in the U.K. in 1958.     
 Amar'e Stoudemire (1982–), former professional basketball player for the New York Knicks. Lived in Port Jervis for a duration of grade school and middle school.  It is said that this is where he played basketball at local parks and first fell in love with the sport of basketball.
 Hudson Van Etten, Medal of Honor recipient, was born in Port Jervis.

Gallery

References

Notes

External links

 City of Port Jervis Website

 
Cities in New York (state)
Neversink River
Populated places established in 1690
Poughkeepsie–Newburgh–Middletown metropolitan area
Cities in Orange County, New York
Cities in the New York metropolitan area
1690 establishments in the Province of New York
New York (state) populated places on the Delaware River